Lassi Karonen (born 17 March 1976 in Djura) is a Swedish rower. He finished 6th in the men's single sculls at the 2008 Summer Olympics. In 2012 Summer Olympics he finished 4th, also in men's single sculls.

References 
 
 

1976 births
Living people
Swedish male rowers
Olympic rowers of Sweden
Rowers at the 2008 Summer Olympics
Rowers at the 2012 Summer Olympics
Swedish people of Finnish descent